The 2012 Asia Cup (also called Micromax Asia Cup) was an international cricket tournament held in Bangladesh from 11 to 22 March 2012. Like the previous event, the tournament featured the four Test-playing nations from Asia: Bangladesh, India, Pakistan and Sri Lanka. India entered the tournament as the defending 2010 Asia Cup Pakistan won the tournament by beating Bangladesh in the final by 2 runs.

Background
China was interested to host the Asia Cup at Guangzhou but it was decided by the Asian Cricket Council that Bangladesh will host the event. It was the third time Bangladesh hosted the event after 1988 and 2000.

The event was supposed to be held between 1 and 11 March 2012, but was rescheduled to avoid conflicting with the ODI tri-series in Australia that also included Sri Lanka and India, which ended on 8 March. The tournament was played from 11 to 22 March.

Venues
All the 7 matches were played at Sher-e-Bangla Cricket Stadium, Mirpur.

Match Officials
Umpires from neutral countries:
 - Ian Gould
 - Paul Reiffel
 - Steve Davis

Umpires from participating countries:
 - Sundaram Ravi
 - Gazi Sohel
 - Masudur Rahman
 - Sharfuddoula
 - Ruchira Palliyaguruge
 - Shozab Raza

Match Referee:
 - David Boon

Squads

Notes

Points table

Points system:
 Win: 4 points
 Loss: no points
 Tie/No result: 2 points
 Bonus point: If a team wins, with a run rate ≥ 1.25 times that of the opposing team, that team gets 1 bonus point. (A team's run rate is number of runs scored divided by number of overs faced, except that a team is treated as having faced the full 50 overs if it loses all of its wickets)

If two or more teams have the same number of points, the right to play in the final is determined as follows:
 The team having the higher number of wins.
 If two or more teams have same number of wins, the team with more wins against the other teams who have equal number of points and wins. (Head to head)
 If still equal, the team with the higher number of bonus points.
 If still equal, the team with the greater net run rate.

Matches

Group stage matches

1st Match
All times local (UTC+06:00)

2nd Match

3rd Match

4th Match

5th Match

6th Match

Final

Records and statistics

Batting

Bowling

Most Man of the match

References

External links 
 
 2012 Asia Cup on ESPNcricinfo

2012 in Bangladeshi cricket
Asia Cup
International cricket competitions in 2012
International cricket competitions in Bangladesh